The 101st Brigade was an infantry brigade formation of the British Army during the First World War. It was raised as part of the new army, also known as Kitchener's Army, and assigned to the 34th Division. The brigade served on the Western Front and was decimated on 1 July 1916, the first day of the Battle of the Somme.

Formation 
The infantry battalions did not all serve at once, but all were assigned to the brigade during the war.
15th Battalion, Royal Scots (1st Edinburgh)
16th Battalion, Royal Scots (2nd Edinburgh)
10th Battalion, Lincolnshire Regiment (Grimsby Chums)
11th Battalion, Suffolk Regiment (Cambridge)
2/4th Battalion, Queen's Royal Regiment (West Surrey)
4th Battalion, Royal Sussex Regiment
2nd Battalion, Loyal North Lancashire Regiment
101st Machine Gun Company
101st Trench Mortar Battery

References 

Infantry brigades of the British Army in World War I
Pals Brigades of the British Army